ISC is an Australian clothing manufacturer. The company was founded in the Sydney suburb of Rosebery in 1991. ISC mainly manufactures team uniforms for several sports, including Australian football, rugby league, rugby union, association football, cricket, basketball, netball as well as schoolwear. ISC also produces licensed casual wear clothing such as polo shirts, hoodies, jackets, and caps.

History 

In the past, ISC has sponsored the Australian national cricket team from 1991 to 2002, the 1992 Cricket World Cup, the Milton Keynes Dons from 2010 to 2012, the NBL from 2014 to 2016, and the English national rugby league team from 2010 to 2015.

ISC had an exclusive contract with Marvel to design rugby jerseys for nine of their National Rugby League teams to wear that displays some of Marvel's superheroes. There have been three series of "ISC Marvel Heroes" jerseys, the latest series was run in late March and early April 2017. A similar promotion was brought to the Super League in May 2017.

Current major partnerships

Australian Rules Football

Australian Football League 

  Hawthorn Football Club

Soccer

Club teams

  Canberra United (female)

Rugby league

National teams
  Papua New Guinea

National Rugby League

  Canberra Raiders

Rugby union

Super Rugby
  NSW Waratahs

See also

 List of fitness wear brands
 List of sporting goods manufacturers
 List of companies of Australia

References

External links
 

Sportswear brands
1991 establishments in Australia
Clothing companies established in 1991
Australian companies established in 1991
Sporting goods manufacturers of Australia
Clothing brands of Australia
Manufacturing companies based in Sydney